St. Paul's Catholic Church is a historic Roman Catholic church located in Portsmouth, Virginia, United States. It is a compact Gothic Revival style, cruciform plan church.  It is constructed of load-bearing masonry walls clad in quarry-faced granite.  The church was designed by John Peebles (1876-1934) in 1897, and dedicated in 1905. It is the fifth church on the site.  Also on the property is a contributing rectory constructed in 1913.

It was listed on the National Register of Historic Places in 2002.  It is located in the Downtown Portsmouth Historic District.

Yearly, the choir director and organ player, Nick Nespoli, who is also the chorus instructor of Western Branch High School, has his students from school perform at the church around Christmas. This concert is a free event, and the music performed ranges from secular to religious music. The main pieces performed are selections from the Messiah, by Handel, or the Gloria RV 589 by Vivaldi.

References

External links

St. Paul's Church website

Churches in Portsmouth, Virginia
Churches in the Roman Catholic Diocese of Richmond
Gothic Revival church buildings in Virginia
Individually listed contributing properties to historic districts on the National Register in Virginia
National Register of Historic Places in Portsmouth, Virginia
Churches on the National Register of Historic Places in Virginia
Roman Catholic churches completed in 1905
1905 establishments in Virginia
20th-century Roman Catholic church buildings in the United States